The Stäfeliflue (1,922 m) is a mountain of the Emmental Alps, located on the border between the Swiss cantons of Lucerne and Obwalden.

References

External links
 Stäfeliflue on Hikr

Mountains of the Alps
Mountains of Obwalden
Mountains of the canton of Lucerne
Emmental Alps
Lucerne–Obwalden border
Mountains of Switzerland